The 2013 Sacramento State Hornets football team represented California State University, Sacramento as a member of the Big Sky Conference during the 2013 NCAA Division I FCS football season. Led by Marshall Sperbeck in his seventh in final season as head coach, Sacramento State compiled an overall record of 5–7 with a mark of 4–4 in conference play, placing eighth in the Big Sky. The Hornets played home games at Hornet Stadium in Sacramento, California.

Sperbeck resigned as head coach on April 29, 2014. He finished his tenure at Sacramento State with a record of 35–44.

Schedule

Despite Southern Utah also being a member of the Big Sky, the September 15 game against Sacramento State was considered a non-conference game.

References

Sacramento State
Sacramento State Hornets football seasons
Sacramento State Hornets football